Nimoth is a village located in Dahina Block of Rewari district of Haryana state, India. Its postal head office is Dahina.

Demographics
The total population of the village is 4316. Male population is 2289 while female population is 2027. as per Population Census 2011.

Places to visit 
Nimoth is famous for almost 500 years old temple of great Saint Baba Bishandas ji Maharaj .The temple is situated on kapoori road.

Adjacent villages
Zainabad
Manpura
Dhani Thather Bad
Srinagar  
Dhawana
Luhana
Mandola
Kapuri
Rambass
Bohka

References 

Villages in Rewari district